Ivan Pelizzoli (born 18 November 1980) is an Italian former professional footballer who played as a goalkeeper.

Club career

Early career
After playing for Atalanta and Triestina from 1997 to 2000, he made his Serie A debut with Atalanta on 5 November 2000, during the 2000–01 season; the promising goalkeeper soon emerged to prominence, overtaking Alberto Fontana and Davide Pinato as the club's starting goalkeeper, and was initially considered by the media to be one of the best young goalkeepers in Italy.

Roma
In the following summer he was signed by 2001 Italian champions A.S. Roma for 33 billion lire in 5-year contract, worth 3,372.2 million lire per season, (signed in June 2001; about €17,043,078 transfer fee and €1.742 million wage; paid via 27,000 million lire cash and Alessandro Rinaldi), winning the Supercoppa Italiana in his first season. He was initially a backup to Francesco Antonioli, but midway through the 2002–03 Serie A season, he became the club's first choice goalkeeper under Fabio Capello, helping Roma to reach the 2003 Coppa Italia final. During the 2003–04 Serie A season, Pelizzoli conceded the fewest goals in the entire Serie A behind a defensive force which consisted mainly of Christian Panucci, Walter Samuel, Cristian Chivu and Vincent Candela, as Roma finished the season in second place; during the season, he also managed what is currently the 5th longest consecutive run without conceding a goal in Serie A, setting a 774-minute unbeaten streak. Despite his performances, he was not picked for the Euro 2004 (although he was included in the Italian Olympic squad instead, helping the team to a bronze medal), but looked set to become a long-term first choice in Roma. However, his subsequent unstable performances gave Gianluca Curci and Carlo Zotti the chance to play during the 2004–05 Serie A season.

Reggina
Due to his lack of competitive action, he signed for Reggina in 2005 in a co-ownership deal for a peppercorn fee of €500 to compete with Nicola Pavarini for the role of the team's first choice goalkeeper. Reggina pinned their hopes on Pelizzoli regaining his spectacular form from the 2003–04 season, but he could not really find his feet in Reggina, though he played his part in keeping the team in the top-flight division. In June 2006 Roma gave up the remain 50% registration rights to Reggina for free.

Lokomotiv Moscow
On 31 January 2007, Pelizzoli was captured by FC Lokomotiv Moscow, signing him on with a three-year contract. In his first season, he competed for a first team place with Eldin Jakupović, and in his second season with Ivan Levenets and Marek Čech, demoting him to the 4th choice goalkeeper.

AlbinoLeffe
On 31 August 2009, Lokomotiv Moscow loaned Pelizzoli to the Serie B club U.C. AlbinoLeffe for one season, with Eldin Jakupović returning to Moscow. Pelizzoli was brought in as AlbinoLeffe's goalkeepers only had Serie C1 experience, namely Stefano Layeni, Daniel Offredi and Paolo Branduani. He made his team debut on 19 September 2009. After playing 3 games in September, he was out-favored and lost his place in both first choice and on the bench. Pelizzoli re-gained his regular place since November.

Cagliari
In August 2010, Pelizzoli joined Cagliari. He hinted he would take on an understudy role in the Sardinian club.

Pescara
In August 2012, Pescara acquired Pelizzoli as a back-up to Mattia Perin.

Virtus Entella

Vicenza
On 30 March 2016, Pelizzoli joined Vicenza in a short-term contract.

Piacenza
On 24 November 2016, he signed a contract with Piacenza. He left the team in 2017.

Foggia
On 14 July 2017, Pelizzoli signed a contract with Foggia. He left the club again at the end of 2017 without having made an appearance.

International career
Pelizzoli made his senior international debut with Italy in 2003, making 2 caps in total between 2003 and 2004. He was one of three over-age players representing Italy at the 2004 Summer Olympics, ahead of Marco Amelia, as first choice goalkeeper, winning a Bronze medal. He also played for the Italy under-21 side at the 2002 UEFA European Under-21 Football Championship, ahead of Generoso Rossi and Vitangelo Spadavecchia as first choice, where Italy reached the semi-finals.

Career statistics

International

Honours

Club
Roma
Supercoppa Italiana: 2001

References

External links
 
 Profile at Football.it 
 International caps at FIGC.com 

1980 births
Living people
Footballers from Bergamo
Association football goalkeepers
Italian footballers
Atalanta B.C. players
U.S. Triestina Calcio 1918 players
A.S. Roma players
Reggina 1914 players
FC Lokomotiv Moscow players
U.C. AlbinoLeffe players
Cagliari Calcio players
Calcio Padova players
Delfino Pescara 1936 players
Virtus Entella players
L.R. Vicenza players
Piacenza Calcio 1919 players
Calcio Foggia 1920 players
Italy youth international footballers
Italy under-21 international footballers
Italy international footballers
Footballers at the 2004 Summer Olympics
Olympic footballers of Italy
Olympic bronze medalists for Italy
Italian expatriate footballers
Serie A players
Serie B players
Serie C players
Russian Premier League players
Expatriate footballers in Russia
Italian expatriate sportspeople in Russia
Olympic medalists in football
Medalists at the 2004 Summer Olympics